Dipivefrine (INN) or dipivefrin (USAN), trade name Propine among others, is a prodrug of epinephrine, and is used to treat open-angle glaucoma. It is available as a 0.1% ophthalmic solution. It is no longer available in the United States.

Contraindications
Use in narrow-angle glaucoma may be dangerous because it could make the eye susceptible to an attack of angle closure, causing an increase in pressure and pain, and possibly loss of vision.

Side effects
The most common side effects of dipivefrine are burning, stinging and other irritations of the eye. Possible, but uncommon, side effects are those of epinephrine: tachycardia (fast heartbeat), hypertension (high blood pressure) and arrhythmias (irregular heartbeat).

Pharmacology
Dipivefrine penetrates the cornea and is then hydrolysed to epinephrine by esterase enzymes. It increases outflow of the aqueous humour and also reduces its formation (mediated by its action on α1 and α2 receptors), thus reducing pressure inside the eye. It also increases the conductivity of trabecular filtering cells (a β2 receptor mediated action). It is preferred to epinephrine because it is longer acting, more consistent in its action and better tolerated.

References

Alpha-1 adrenergic receptor agonists
Alpha-2 adrenergic receptor agonists
Beta-adrenergic agonists
Catechol ethers
Catecholamines
Ophthalmology drugs
Phenylethanolamines
Pivalate esters
Prodrugs